Danpite Chhele (English: The Bad Lad) is a 1980 Bangladeshi film starring Razzak and child artist Master Shakil. It is a children's film.

Cast 
 Razzak as Teacher of School
 Azad Rahman Shakil, known as Master Shakil as Kamal
Anowara as mother of Kamal
Sharmili Ahmed as mother of Tarek
Nazmul Huda Bachchu

Music
Khan Ataur Rahman composed the songs. All the songs were sung by his daughter Rumana Islam.

"Hayre Amar Matano Desh" - Rumana Islam

References

1980 films
Bengali-language Bangladeshi films
Films scored by Khan Ataur Rahman
1980s Bengali-language films